Asmat Diasamidze (born ) is a Georgian female recurve archer. She competed at the 2000 Summer Olympics in the individual event and team event.  She won the gold medal at the 2011 Archery European Indoor Championships in the women's team event.

References

External links 
Asmat Diasamidze at Sports Reference
http://news.sportbox.ru/Vidy_sporta/strelba_luk/Asmat-Diasamidze-Streliba-iz-luka-30011973

1973 births
Living people
Female archers from Georgia (country)
Place of birth missing (living people)
Archers at the 2000 Summer Olympics
Olympic archers of Georgia (country)